Saturday Night's Main Event is an American professional wrestling television program that is produced by WWE (known at the time of launch as the World Wrestling Federation). Premiering in 1985, it originally aired on NBC in the United States as 29 occasional replacements for Saturday Night Live until 1991, then twice on Fox in 1992. It was revived in 2006 for five NBC episodes before ending in 2008. In Canada, it also aired on Citytv and Global Television Network in order to meet simultaneous substitution rights.

At the time of the original airing, it was a rare example of professional wrestling being broadcast on an over-the-air commercial television network after the 1950s. It coincided with and contributed to the apogee of the "second golden age" of professional wrestling in the United States. In a time when weekly programming consisted primarily of established stars dominating enhancement talent, Saturday Night's Main Event was made up almost entirely of star vs. star bouts, including title matches and specialty matches such as steel cage matches, handicap matches, etc.

All episodes of Saturday Night's Main Event are available for streaming on Peacock in the United States and the WWE Network elsewhere, with some episodes slightly altered from their original broadcasts. On these platforms, the May 1985 to January 1988 episodes do not have the original opening and closing theme songs. Additionally, sponsored segments that aired as part of the original broadcasts, such as the "Mountain Dew Slam of the Night", have been removed.

In April 2022, WWE revived the Saturday Night's Main Event title for house shows held on Saturday nights.

History

Original run (1985–1992)

Saturday Night's Main Event debuted on May 11, 1985, in the late-night time slot normally assigned to reruns of the NBC sketch comedy Saturday Night Live. Then-SNL executive producer Dick Ebersol had made a deal with WWF owner Vince McMahon to produce the show, after Ebersol had seen the high ratings that two WWF specials drew on MTV in 1984–85: The Brawl to End It All and The War to Settle the Score. Although the show aired infrequently, it did, starting in 1986, settle into a predictable pattern of airdates: New Year's weekend, an episode in late February/early March, an episode in late April/early May, an episode in late September/early October, and Thanksgiving weekend. 1989 and 1990 both offered episodes in July promoted as "Summertime Bonus Editions."

Saturday Night's Main Event was a tremendous rating success for NBC during its heyday, most notably on the March 14, 1987, show, which drew an 11.6 rating, which to this day remains the highest rating any show has ever done in that time slot. That show was headlined by a battle royal involving Hulk Hogan and André the Giant, who were slated to face each other at WrestleMania III. As Hogan rarely wrestled on the WWF syndicated and cable television shows, Saturday Night's Main Event was the program on free television where most viewers were able to see him in action. The success of Saturday Night's Main Event led to several Friday night prime time specials, known as The Main Event. The first of these, on February 5, 1988, included a WrestleMania III rematch between Hogan and André and drew 33 million viewers and a 15.2 rating, which is still the highest-rated television show in American professional wrestling history.
While ratings remained strong through 1990, they began to fall shortly thereafter. NBC, who had just acquired the rights to broadcast NBA games nationwide, now started to lose interest in wrestling, and Saturday Night's Main Event was dropped. Its final NBC airing occurred on April 27, 1991. Fox picked up the show in 1992, but it was only shown twice on that network; on February 8, 1992, and the final Saturday Night's Main Event of the original run was broadcast on November 14, 1992.

For much of its history, Saturday Night's Main Event was hosted by McMahon and Jesse "The Body" Ventura with the occasional use of Bobby Heenan in 1986 and 1987. In 1990, Roddy Piper replaced Ventura as McMahon's broadcast partner when Ventura left the WWF. On the two episodes that aired on Fox, Heenan served as McMahon's partner. From 1985 to 1988, the opening theme song for the NBC version was "Obsession" by Animotion with the closing theme being "Take Me Home" by Phil Collins, and also the beginning of "Take On Me" by a-ha was used for show bumpers. Steve Winwood's "Higher Love" was also used as a closing theme. In February 1988, the songs were replaced with an original WWF-created instrumental theme. The new instrumental theme was originally used as the theme of the 1987 WWF Slammy Awards.  A different opening theme song was used for the February 1992 episode.

Selected episodes were also shown in the UK on ITV in its weekly Saturday lunchtime World Of Sports slot, mainly thanks to the popularity of the British Bulldogs.

Revived run (2006–2008)
When WWE's flagship show, Raw, returned to the USA Network in 2005, Saturday Night's Main Event was revived in 2006 as a "special series" to air on occasion on NBC as part of a deal between WWE and NBCUniversal. The Raw, SmackDown, and ECW brand rosters appeared on the show.

Saturday Night's Main Event returned to NBC on March 18, 2006, in a prime-time slot. The first episode aired on a 1-hour time delay, the second episode aired live, with the three remaining episodes airing at a later date. Since 2009, Saturday Night's Main Event was replaced instead with WrestleMania: The World Television Premiere.

Events

Results

World Wrestling Federation

Saturday Night's Main Event I

Saturday Night's Main Event I took place May 10, 1985, from Uniondale, New York, in Nassau Veterans Memorial Coliseum, and aired May 11, 1985. The event aired on NBC and drew an 8.8 rating.

Saturday Night's Main Event II

Saturday Night's Main Event II took place on October 3, 1985, from East Rutherford, New Jersey, at the Brendan Byrne Arena, and aired on October 5, 1985. The event aired on NBC and drew an 8.3 rating.

During the broadcast, Uncle Elmer was legitimately married to Joyce Stazko.

Saturday Night's Main Event III

Saturday Night's Main Event III took place on October 31, 1985, from Hershey, Pennsylvania, at the Hersheypark Arena, and aired on November 2, 1985. The event aired on NBC and drew a 6.3 rating.

Saturday Night's Main Event IV

Saturday Night's Main Event IV took place on December 19, 1985, from Tampa, Florida, at the USF Sun Dome, and aired on January 4, 1986. The event aired on NBC and drew a 10.4 rating.

Saturday Night's Main Event V

Saturday Night's Main Event V took place on February 15, 1986, from Phoenix, Arizona, at the Arizona Veterans Memorial Coliseum, and aired on March 1, 1986. The event aired on NBC and drew a 10.0 rating.

Events during three of the matches – The Dream Team vs. The British Bulldogs for the WWF Tag Team Championship; Hulk Hogan vs. The Magnificent Muraco for the WWF World Heavyweight Championship; and Mr. T vs. "Battling" Bob Orton in a boxing match – helped set up three of the four major matches at WrestleMania 2.

The premiere airing of the video for "Real American," Hulk Hogan's entrance theme, took place.

Saturday Night's Main Event VI

Saturday Night's Main Event VI took place on May 1, 1986, from Providence, Rhode Island, at the Providence Civic Center, and aired on May 3, 1986. The show aired on NBC and drew a 9.3 rating.

Jake Roberts sneak-attacked Ricky Steamboat and took him out with his finisher, the DDT, on the arena's concrete floor prior to the match starting, helping set up a feud that continued through the summer and early fall of 1986.

Saturday Night's Main Event VII

Saturday Night's Main Event VII took place on September 13, 1986, from Richfield, Ohio, at the Coliseum at Richfield, and aired on October 4, 1986. The event aired on NBC and drew a 9.4 rating.

Saturday Night's Main Event VIII

Saturday Night's Main Event VIII took place on November 15, 1986, from Los Angeles, California, at the Los Angeles Memorial Sports Arena, and aired on November 29, 1986. The event aired on NBC and drew a 9.7 rating.

Saturday Night's Main Event IX

Saturday Night's Main Event IX took place on December 14, 1986, from Hartford, Connecticut, at the Hartford Civic Center, and aired on January 3, 1987. The event aired on NBC and drew a 10.6 rating.

The steel cage match between Hulk Hogan and Paul Orndorff was initially declared a draw when both wrestlers escaped the cage at approximately the same time and two referees – Joey Marella and Danny Davis, the latter playing up his crooked referee gimmick – disputing the finish. When footage from the escape spot was deemed "inconclusive," the match was re-started and continued to Hogan gaining a decisive win over Orndorff.

Saturday Night's Main Event X

Saturday Night's Main Event X took place on February 21, 1987, from Detroit, Michigan, at the Joe Louis Arena, and aired on March 14, 1987. The event aired on NBC and drew an 11.6 rating.

Saturday Night's Main Event XI

Saturday Night's Main Event XI took place on April 28, 1987, from Notre Dame, Indiana, at the Edmund P. Joyce Center, and aired May 2, 1987. The event aired on NBC and drew a 9.5 rating.

While a match featuring Hulk Hogan was not included in the show, a pre-taped interview with comments regarding WrestleMania III and a possible future rematch was included. A separate interview with Andre the Giant and Bobby Heenan, also reflecting on WrestleMania III, also aired.

Saturday Night's Main Event XII

Saturday Night's Main Event XII took place on September 23, 1987, from Hershey, Pennsylvania, at the Hersheypark Arena, and aired October 3, 1987. The event aired on NBC and drew a 9.7 rating.

As the result of events during the Randy Savage vs. The Honky Tonk Man match – a beatdown of Savage by Honky and The Hart Foundation, and Hulk Hogan running in to save Savage – The Mega Powers alliance of Hogan, Savage and Miss Elizabeth was formed.
The music video for "Piledriver" (as performed by Koko B. Ware), the title track of the WWF's second album of entrance music and performances by the wrestlers, debuted.

Saturday Night's Main Event XIII

Saturday Night's Main Event XIII took place on November 11, 1987, from Seattle, Washington, at the Seattle Center Coliseum, and aired November 28, 1987 on NBC.

Andre the Giant accompanied King Kong Bundy and Bobby Heenan to the ring for Bundy's match vs. Hulk Hogan. Midway through the match, Andre was ejected from ringside for attempting to interfere in the match; as he returned to the locker room, he shoved a WWF cameraman to the floor.

Brian Bosworth, linebacker for the Seattle Seahawks, was shown in the audience.

Saturday Night's Main Event XIV

Saturday Night's Main Event XIV took place on December 7, 1987, from Landover, Maryland, at the Capital Centre, and aired on January 2, 1988 on NBC.

During the Hulk Hogan-King Kong Bundy match, referee Jack Krueger was accidentally caught and knocked out by Bundy in an attempt to avalanche Hogan; the match was briefly interrupted as a new referee, Dave Hebner, took Krueger's place. Following the match, Andre the Giant sneak-attacked Hogan and choked him to the brink of unconsciousness, fighting off several wrestlers who came to aid Hogan; this served as one of the build-ups to the Hogan-Andre match on The Main Event, which aired February 5, 1988.

Saturday Night's Main Event XV

Saturday Night's Main Event XV took place on March 7, 1988, from Nashville, Tennessee, at the Nashville Municipal Auditorium, and aired on March 12, 1988. Although there were 10,000 in attendance, it was reportedly a heavily papered event. The event aired on NBC and drew a 10.0 rating.

During the tapings, Don Muraco vs Butch Reed was taped but aired on Prime Time Wrestling on April 11, 1988.

The match between Hulk Hogan and Harley Race saw Race lay Hogan across a table outside the ring and attempted to hit a diving headbutt from the ring apron, but Hogan moved out of the way and Race crashed through the table, suffering a legitimate injury that would eventually force him into retirement in 1991.

After the Ted DiBiase and André the Giant match, Hogan appeared at ringside to clear the ring of DiBiase and Virgil after they began a post-match beatdown of Randy "Macho Man" Savage.

The match between The Islanders (Haku and Tama) and The Killer Bees (Jim Brunzell and B. Brian Blair) was a two-out-of-three-falls match, however only the first fall was televised.

Saturday Night's Main Event XVI

Saturday Night's Main Event XVI took place on April 22, 1988, from Springfield, Massachusetts, at the Springfield Civic Center, and aired April 30, 1988 on NBC. This was the first Saturday Night's Main Event to not feature Hulk Hogan in any of the televised matches or interviews, as he had taken a leave of absence around this time to begin filming No Holds Barred.

Saturday Night's Main Event XVII

Saturday Night's Main Event XVII took place on October 25, 1988, from Baltimore, Maryland, at the Baltimore Arena, and aired October 29, 1988. The event aired on NBC and drew an 8.7 rating.

Saturday Night's Main Event XVIII

Saturday Night's Main Event XVIII took place on November 16, 1988, from Sacramento, California, at the ARCO Arena, and aired November 26, 1988. The event aired on NBC and drew a 9.4 rating.

During the show, Brother Love conducted a special interview Hulk Hogan and Slick.

Saturday Night's Main Event XIX

Saturday Night's Main Event XIX took place on December 7, 1988, from Tampa, Florida, at the USF Sun Dome, and aired January 7, 1989 on NBC.

Events during and after the Hulk Hogan-Akeem match – Randy Savage declining to make the save and run off Akeem and Big Boss Man while they were beating down Hogan, but Savage immediately running to ringside when the heels were threatening to beat up Miss Elizabeth, and then Savage questioning Elizabeth as she tended to a beaten Hogan – helped foreshadow the later heel turn by Savage at The Main Event II in February. 

George Steinbrenner was shown in the front row during this event, and Bobby "The Brain" Heenan at one point remarked about the guy he managed in the ring at the time to Steinbrenner "I've got a ring full of Winfields".

Saturday Night's Main Event XX

Saturday Night's Main Event XX took place on February 16, 1989, from Hershey, Pennsylvania, at the Hersheypark Arena, and aired March 11, 1989. The event aired on NBC and drew a 10.0 rating.

During the event, Mean Gene Okerlund conducted a special interview with Miss Elizabeth to publicly announce whose corner she will be in at WrestleMania V.

Saturday Night's Main Event XXI

Saturday Night's Main Event XXI took place on April 25, 1989, from Des Moines, Iowa, at the Veterans Memorial Auditorium, and aired May 27, 1989 on NBC.

During the steel cage match between Hulk Hogan and Big Boss Man, Hogan superplexed Boss Man from over the top of the cage to the mat, briefly knocking both wrestlers out. Prior to the match, Tommy Lister Jr., in-character as his No Holds Barred movie role of Zeus (the movie's villain), came to ringside and stood in front of the cage entrance, beating down Hogan after daring him to "move me!"

Saturday Night's Main Event XXII

Saturday Night's Main Event XXII took place on July 18, 1989, from Worcester, Massachusetts, at the Worcester Centrum, and aired July 29, 1989 on NBC.

During the Randy Savage-Brutus Beefcake match, Zeus appeared at ringside and interfered on Savage's behalf. Hulk Hogan came to aid Beefcake but was unable to hurt Zeus. The events of this match was one of the pieces to help set up the main event of SummerSlam.

Saturday Night's Main Event XXIII

Saturday Night's Main Event XXIII took place September 21, 1989, from Cincinnati, Ohio, at the Riverfront Coliseum, and aired October 14, 1989. The show was attended by 14,000 people, of which 12,000 were paid. The event aired on NBC and drew a 9.5 rating.

Saturday Night's Main Event XXIV

Saturday Night's Main Event XXIV took place October 31, 1989, from Topeka, Kansas, at the Sunflower State Expocentre, and aired November 25, 1989. The event aired on NBC and drew an 8.7 rating.

Saturday Night's Main Event XXV

Saturday Night's Main Event XXV took place January 3, 1990, from Chattanooga, Tennessee, at the UTC Arena, and aired January 27, 1990. The event aired on NBC and drew an 11.1 rating.

Saturday Night's Main Event XXVI

Saturday Night's Main Event XXVI took place on April 23, 1990, from Austin, Texas, at the Frank Erwin Center, and aired April 28, 1990 on NBC.

Saturday Night's Main Event XXVII

Saturday Night's Main Event XXVII took place July 16, 1990, from Omaha, Nebraska, at the Omaha Civic Auditorium, and aired July 28, 1990. The event aired on NBC and drew a 7.2 rating.

This event saw the debut in WWF of The Texas Tornado.

Saturday Night's Main Event XXVIII

Saturday Night's Main Event XXVIII took place September 18, 1990, from Toledo, Ohio, at the Toledo Sports Arena, and aired October 13, 1990 on NBC.

During the match between Randy Savage and Dusty Rhodes, Ted DiBiase attacked Dusty's son Dustin Rhodes.

Saturday Night's Main Event XXIX

Saturday Night's Main Event XXIX took place April 15, 1991, from Omaha, Nebraska, at the Omaha Civic Auditorium, and aired April 27, 1991. The event drew 9,400 people of which 7,000 were paid. The event aired on NBC and drew a 7.7 rating. Following this event, Saturday Night's Main Event aired two episodes on FOX in 1992, the series then ended until returning to NBC for 5 additional specials beginning in 2006 with Saturday Night's Main Event XXXII.

Saturday Night's Main Event XXX

Saturday Night's Main Event XXX took place on January 27, 1992, from Lubbock, Texas, at the Lubbock Municipal Coliseum, and aired February 8, 1992. The event was the first Saturday Night's Main Event to air on Fox and drew an 8.2 rating and 14.3 million viewers.

Prematch stipulation of the Roddy Piper and The Mountie match for the WWF Intercontinental Championship, stated Bret Hart would face the winner at WrestleMania VIII.

The Legion of Doom (Road Warrior Hawk and Road Warrior Animal) were originally scheduled to take on The Beverly Brothers (Blake Beverly and Beau Beverly), however The Legion of Doom were replaced by Sgt. Slaughter and Jim Duggan.

Following the match between Randy Savage and Jake Roberts, the telecast ended with Miss Elizabeth coming to the ring and celebrating with Savage. A week later during Superstars, it was revealed that Roberts prepared to hit Miss Elizabeth with a steel chair as soon as she stepped backstage, only for The Undertaker to prevent the attack and allow Savage to hit Roberts with a chair of his own.

Saturday Night's Main Event XXXI

Saturday Night's Main Event XXXI took place October 27, 1992, from Terre Haute, Indiana, at the Hulman Center, and aired November 14, 1992. The event aired on Fox and drew a 6.1 rating and 10.6 million viewers. This event was the second and final Saturday Night's Main Event to air on FOX, and the final Saturday Night's Main Event for almost 14 years, until the series returned in 2006 with Saturday Night's Main Event XXXII.

World Wrestling Entertainment

Saturday Night's Main Event XXXII

Saturday Night's Main Event XXXII took place on March 18, 2006, from Detroit, Michigan, at the Cobo Arena. The event aired on a 1-hour tape delay on NBC in the United States and Citytv in Canada with the former network drawing a 3.1 rating. This marked the first Saturday Night's Main Event since 1992 when Saturday Night's Main Event XXXI aired on FOX, and the first on NBC since Saturday Night's Main Event XXIX in 1991.

Mickie James and Trish Stratus fought over the WWE Women's Championship at New Year's Revolution, with Stratus retaining. In the months that followed, James' obsession with Stratus grew to the point that she confessed to Stratus that she was in love with her. James made an attempt to kiss Stratus at Saturday Night's Main Event XXXII, after the duo defeated Candice Michelle and Victoria. After she was rebuffed, James attacked Stratus and later vowed to destroy her.

Jim Ross, Jerry Lawler, and Tazz are the commentators.

Saturday Night's Main Event XXXIII

Saturday Night's Main Event XXXIII took place July 15, 2006, from Dallas, Texas, at the American Airlines Center. The event drew 17,343 people, of which 14,500 were paid. The event aired live on NBC, and drew a 2.6 rating.

Jim Ross and Jerry Lawler are the commentators for Raw, Michael Cole and John Layfield are the commentators for SmackDown, and Joey Styles and Tazz are the commentators for ECW. Justin Roberts was the ring announcer.

Saturday Night's Main Event XXXIV

Saturday Night's Main Event XXXIV took place on May 28, 2007, from Toronto, Ontario, Canada at the Air Canada Centre, and aired June 2, 2007. The event drew 16,176 of which 14,000 were paid. The event aired on NBC and drew a 2.2 rating.

Michael Cole and Jerry Lawler are the commentators. Ashley Massaro, Kristal Marshall, Torrie Wilson, Candice Michelle and Michelle McCool are the various guest ring announcers.

Saturday Night's Main Event XXXV

Saturday Night's Main Event XXXV took place on August 13, 2007, from New York City at Madison Square Garden, and aired August 18, 2007. The event drew 16,827 of which 13,500 were paid. The event aired on NBC and drew a 2.5 rating.

Michael Cole and Jim Ross are the commentators. The guest commentators are John Layfield and Tazz.

Saturday Night's Main Event XXXVI

Saturday Night's Main Event XXXVI took place on July 28, 2008, from Washington, D.C., at the Verizon Center, and aired August 2, 2008. The event aired on NBC as a 1-hour special, and drew a 1.4 rating. The event drew 14,722 of which 12,000 were paid.

Jim Ross and Jerry Lawler are the commentators. CM Punk was the guest commentator for the first televised match.

Home video

VHS release
During the original run, Coliseum Video released two cassettes of Saturday Night's Main Event: Saturday Night's Main Event's Greatest Hits which contained six matches from 1985 to 1987 and More Saturday Night's Main Event containing nine matches from 1988 to 1989.

In 1992, the WWF released through Columbia House, Best of Saturday Night's Main Event (Collector's Edition) comprising five matches from 1988 to 1990.

DVD release
On February 10, 2009, the WWE released a three-disc DVD set on the history of Saturday Night's Main Event. The set includes more than 30 full matches and several non-wrestling segments. Among these are highlights of Uncle Elmer's wedding, Hulk Hogan's "Real American" music video, and Mr. Perfect smashing Hogan's WWF World Heavyweight Championship belt. The first match in the program's history, a six-man tag team match pitting the U.S. Express (Mike Rotundo and Barry Windham) teaming with Ricky Steamboat defeating the team of WWF Tag Team Champions Nikolai Volkoff and The Iron Sheik and their partner George "The Animal" Steele, is included as an extra. Also, two other notable matches are included, both from the program's spinoff The Main Event. The first is a February 1988 rematch from WrestleMania III pitting Hogan against André the Giant, the second a Mega Powers' (Hogan and Randy Savage) bout against the Twin Towers (The Big Boss Man and Akeem) from February 1989. Both had direct implications on each year's WrestleMania: the Hogan-Andre match led to the WWF title being vacated until WrestleMania IV while the Mega Powers-Twin Towers match led to the breakup of the Mega Powers and Hogan eventually defeating Randy Savage to win the WWF title at WrestleMania V.

In the WrestleMania 22 DVD, the XXXII edition was included in the 2nd disc in its entirety.

References

External links
 
  (1985 version)
  (2006 version)

Television series by WWE
NBC original programming
Fox Broadcasting Company original programming
1985 American television series debuts
1992 American television series endings
2006 American television series debuts
2008 American television series endings
Saturday mass media
NBC late-night programming
Fox late-night programming
American television series revived after cancellation